The Visual Effects Society Award for Outstanding Animated Character in an Animated Feature is one of the annual awards given by the Visual Effects Society starting from 2002. Since its inception, the award's title has gone through six title changes, and one major category shift. First awarded in 2002, the award was titled "Best Character Animation in an Animated Motion Picture" and given to the best character animation in an animated film, with no specific character cited. This would change in 2004, when the category was re-titled "Outstanding Performance by an Animated Character in an Animated Motion Picture", and given to visual effects artists for work on a specified character. as well as the voice actor for the character. The category was again re-titled in 2008, this time to "Outstanding Animated Character in an Animated Feature Motion Picture". In 2015, it was titled "Outstanding Animated Performance in an Animated Feature", but changed in 2017 to "Outstanding Animated Character in an Animated Feature", its current title.

Winners and nominees

2000s
Outstanding Character Animation in an Animated Motion Picture

Outstanding Performance by an Animated Character in an Animated Motion Picture

Outstanding Animated Character in an Animated Feature Motion Picture

2010s

Outstanding Animated Performance in an Animated Feature

Outstanding Animated Character in an Animated Feature

2020s

Films with Multiple Nominations

2 Nominations
 Bolt
 Epic
 Finding Nemo
 Kubo and the Two Strings
 The Lego Ninjago Movie 
 The Peanuts Movie
 Surf's Up
 Guillermo del Toro's Pinocchio

Characters with Multiple Nominations

2 Nominations
 Puss in Boots

External links
 Visual Effects Society

References

A
Awards established in 2002